Stock Forecast can refer to:

Stock forecasts based on human experience: Human traders based on their experience in terms of stock price patterns, volume changes, and market news/rumors regarding a particular stock.
Stock forecasts based on machine learning: Systematic research efforts to analyzing patterns of past stock price behaviors and devise algorithms to predict particular stock price patterns. Stock Forecast are widely published in the public domain in the forms of newsletters, investment promotion organizations, public/private forums, and scientific forecast services.